This is a list of railway stations in Canada which have been designated under the Heritage Railway Stations Protection Act. The names given for stations are taken from the Directory of Designated Heritage Railway Stations maintained by the Historic Sites and Monuments Board of Canada, and may not be the same as those used by particular transport agencies.

List of stations

Alberta

British Columbia

Manitoba

New Brunswick

Ontario

Quebec

Saskatchewan

Yukon

See also

 List of railway stations in Canada
 History of rail transport in Canada

References

 
 
Railway stations